Charles Reiffel (1862 - March 14, 1942) was an American lithographer and post-Impressionist painter who became "one of California's best-known painters."

Life
Reiffel was born in 1862 in Indianapolis, Indiana.

Reiffel was initially a lithographer, and he took up painting in 1912. He was self-taught, and he painted en plein air as a post-impressionist. Reiffel first moved to the art colony of Silvermine, Connecticut, where he was the president of the Silvermine Artists' Guild. He later moved to San Diego, where he became "one of California's best-known painters."

Reiffel died on March 14, 1942, in San Diego, at age 79. He was the subject of a retrospective at the San Diego Museum of Art and the San Diego History Center in 2013.

References

1862 births
1942 deaths
People from Indianapolis
People from Fairfield County, Connecticut
Artists from San Diego
American lithographers
American male painters
Painters from California
Post-impressionist painters
19th-century American painters
19th-century American male artists
20th-century American painters
20th-century American male artists